Acronicta digna is a moth of the family Noctuidae. It is found in the Korean Peninsula, China, Japan (Honshu, Shikoku, Kyushu), the Russian Far East (Primorye, southern Khabarovsk, Amur region) and Taiwan.

External links
Korean Insects

Acronicta
Moths of Asia
Moths described in 1881